Zander du Plessis (born 8 April 2000) is a South African rugby union player for the  in the Currie Cup. His regular positions are fly-half, centre or fullback.

Du Plessis was named in the  side for the 2022 Currie Cup Premier Division.

References

South African rugby union players
Living people
Rugby union fly-halves
Rugby union fullbacks
Rugby union centres
Griquas (rugby union) players
2000 births
Lions (United Rugby Championship) players